Big Black River is a river in the U.S. state of Mississippi and a tributary of the Mississippi River. Its origin is in Webster County near the town of Eupora in the north central part of the state. It is the major contributor to the Big Black River Basin. It forms part of the northern border of Choctaw County, passes through Montgomery County, and forms the eastern border of Holmes County and the northern border of Claiborne County.

The Big Black River and most of its tributaries are silt-filled. The rivers carry large amounts of suspended sediment, resulting mostly from agricultural runoff. These tributaries are slow-flowing muddy streams. However, some are swift-flowing with sandy bottoms.

The Battle of Big Black River Bridge, fought during the Battle of Vicksburg,
was part of the Vicksburg Campaign in the American Civil War.

Big Black River Basin

Its elevation varies from 50 to 650 feet (14 to 198 meters) above sea level. Most of its small tributaries are in the upper part of the basin and flow only part of the year. The terrain is hilly with 56% of the land forested and 39% used for farming and cattle ranching.

Battle site
During the American Civil War, a pivotal battle between the Union and Confederate forces occurred along the Big Black River, culminating in the Siege of Vicksburg in 1863. Commanded by General Ulysses S. Grant, Union forces defeated Confederate troops under General John C. Pemberton at the Battle of Champion Hill. Grant chased Pemberton, who was headed toward Vicksburg. Pemberton left 5,000 troops to make a stand on both sides of the Big Black River after his Champion Hill defeat, while he withdrew with his main command to nearby Vicksburg.

See also
List of rivers of Mississippi

Notes

External links

The Big Black River Basin Map
Big Black River Bridge (Big Black)
Map of Big Black River
Big Black and Homochitto River Basins
The Big Black Bridge
Big Black River Bridge Civil War Mississippi
Big Black River  at West
Historical Maps of Big Black River (Miss)

Rivers of Mississippi
Tributaries of the Mississippi River
Bodies of water of Webster County, Mississippi
Bodies of water of Madison County, Mississippi
Bodies of water of Attala County, Mississippi
Bodies of water of Hinds County, Mississippi
Bodies of water of Warren County, Mississippi